Andy Murray defeated Gilles Simon in the final, 6–4, 7–6(8–6) to win the singles tennis title at the 2008 Madrid Open. It was his second Masters title.

David Nalbandian was the defending champion, but lost in the third round to Juan Martín del Potro.

This was the last edition of the tournament to be held on indoor hard courts, as it would switch to outdoor clay courts the following year.

Seeds
All seeds receive a bye into the second round.

Draw

Finals

Top half

Section 1

Section 2

Bottom half

Section 3

Section 4

Qualifying

Qualifying seeds

Qualifiers

Lucky loser
  Simone Bolelli

Qualifying draw

First qualifier

Second qualifier

Third qualifier

Fourth qualifier

Fifth qualifier

Sixth qualifier

References

External links
Draw
Qualifying Draw
ITF tournament profile

Singles